Constitutional Court of the Republic of Latvia is an independent court, which was established in 1996 on basis of amendments in law "On Judicial Power" and in the Constitution of Latvia made in 1994. It acts in accordance with the Constitutional Court Law and the Constitution.

The Court meets in a former a residential building commissioned by Emil von Boetticher (1836–1907), the Burgomaster of Riga from 1881 to 1889, and designed by architect Friedrich Wilhelm Hess.

See also
 Judiciary
 Rule of law
 Rule According to Higher Law

References

External links
 

Latvia
Latvian constitutional law